Tsentralnaya Usadba sovkhoza Pugachyovsky is a rural locality (a settlement) and the administrative center of Pugachyovskoye Rural Settlement, Anninsky District, Voronezh Oblast, Russia. The population was 743 as of 2010. There are 10 streets.

Geography 
The settlement is located 25 km northeast of Anna (the district's administrative centre) by road. Posyolok Oktyabrskogo otdeleniya sovkhoza Pugachyovsky is the nearest rural locality.

References 

Rural localities in Anninsky District